James Jackson may refer to:

James Jackson

Military
 James Jackson (British Army officer) (1790–1871), British Army general
 James Jackson (colonial administrator), British Army officer, acting commandant of St Mary's Island, 1829–1830
 James S. Jackson (1823–1862), Union General in the American Civil War
 James W. Jackson (c. 1824–1861), shooter of Elmer Ellsworth during the American Civil War
 James Jackson (Medal of Honor) (1833–1916), U.S. Army officer
 James F. Jackson (born 1951), Lieutenant General in the United States Air Force

Politics
 James Jackson (Georgia politician) (1757–1806), Revolutionary War soldier, Georgia congressman, senator and governor
 James Jackson (congressman) (1819–1887), Georgia Congressman, grandson of Senator James Jackson
 James H. Jackson (b. 1939), American politician, science teacher, coach and businessman in Iowa.
 James M. Jackson (1825–1901), West Virginia Congressman
 James Jackson Jr. (New York politician) (c. 1826–1891), New York politician
 James Jackson (Massachusetts politician) (1881–1952), American politician in Massachusetts
 James Jackson (Rhode Island politician), American politician from Rhode Island
 James K. Jackson, Secretary of State of Alabama, 1894–1898

Religion
 James Jackson (historian) (died 1770), Anglican clergyman and author
 James Jackson (priest) (1778–1841), Anglican priest
 James Jackson (clergyman) (c. 1789/90–1851), Canadian Methodist minister

Sports
 James Jackson (footballer, born 1900) (1900–c. 1976), British footballer for Aberdeen and Liverpool
 James Jackson (cyclist) (1908–1977), Canadian Olympic cyclist
 James Jackson (American football) (born 1976), football player
 Boo Jackson (born 1981), former American basketball player

Other
 James Jackson (steelmaker) (1771–1829), English manufacturer who established the first steel mill in France
 James Jackson (physician) (1777–1867), Massachusetts physician
 James Hayter Jackson (1800–1877), New Zealand mariner, whaler and trader
 James Caleb Jackson (1811–1895), inventor of granula
 James U. Jackson (1856–1925), founder and developer of the city of North Augusta, South Carolina
 James Ranalph Jackson (1882–1975), Australian painter
 James R. Jackson (1924–2011), American mathematician
 James Jackson (psychologist) (1944–2020), social psychologist and member of the National Science Board
 James A. Jackson (born 1954), British professor of geophysics at Cambridge University
 James D. Jackson, sociology professor and candidate in the United States House of Representatives elections in Mississippi

Jim Jackson
Jim Jackson may refer to:
Jim Jackson (musician) (1876–1933), musician of the 1920s and 1930s
Jim Jackson (baseball) (1877–1955), Major League Baseball outfielder
Jim Jackson (Australian rules footballer) (1890–1976), player and coach at Hawthorn
Jim Jackson (ice hockey) (born 1960), hockey player
Jim Jackson (sportscaster) (born 1963), ice hockey sportscaster
Jim Jackson (basketball) (born 1970), American professional basketball player

Jimmy Jackson
Jimmy Jackson may refer to:
Jimmy Jackson (footballer, born 1875) (1875–?), Scottish footballer for Newcastle United and Woolwich Arsenal
Jimmy Jackson (racing driver) (1910–1984), American racing car driver
Jimmy Jackson (footballer, born 1931) (1931–2013), Scottish footballer for Notts County
Jimmy Jackson (wrestler) (1956–2008), American freestyle wrestler
Jimmy Jackson (tennis) (born 1975), American tennis player

Jamie Jackson
Jamie Jackson may refer to:
Jamie Jackson (footballer) (born 1986), English footballer, currently playing for Buxton
Jamie Jackson (actor) (born 1970), Australian actor